Rafael Cabrera Gómez (November 13, 1924 – June 8, 1990) was a Cuban outfielder in the Negro leagues in the 1940s.

A native of Guane, Cuba, Cabrera made his Negro leagues debut in 1944 with the Indianapolis–Cincinnati Clowns, and played with the club again in 1948. He died in New York, New York in 1990 at age 65.

References

External links
 and Seamheads

1924 births
1990 deaths
Indianapolis Clowns players
20th-century African-American sportspeople